Mathieu Cozza (born 12 April 2002) is a French rugby league footballer who plays as a  or  for the Featherstone Rovers in the Betfred Championship.

In 2021 he made his Catalans debut in the Super League against the Salford Red Devils.

References

External links
Catalans Dragons profile

2000 births
Living people
Barrow Raiders players
Catalans Dragons players
Featherstone Rovers players
French rugby league players
Rugby league props
Rugby league locks